Foster Yeoman Limited, based near Frome, Somerset, England, was one of Europe's largest independent quarrying and asphalt companies. It was sold to Aggregate Industries in 2006.

History
The company was founded by Foster Yeoman, from Hartlepool, at Dulcote, near Wells, in 1923. He was a former ship owner and had worked in the iron and steel business. Yeoman had served in the First World War and went into quarrying to provide employment for ex-soldiers.

Between the wars Foster Yeoman Limited supplied contractors and local authorities in the South of England, reaching an early peak of prosperity in the 1930s. During the Second World War, the firm supplied materials for the construction of airfields. Most stone was sent away by rail as it is today.

After the war, with Foster Yeoman ailing, business declined and the company came full circle, returning to the £20,000 turnover it had enjoyed in 1923. In 1949, Foster died and his son, John Foster Yeoman, became a managing director at the age of 21. Educated at Monkton Combe School, Millfield and the University of Bristol, he set about turning the company around, despite his youth and inexperience.  He employed Ron Torr to redevelop the plant and within four years the company was back in profit.

Dulcote was not the best location and, with an eye to rising costs, competition and the need for future expansion, John Yeoman bought the under-exploited Merehead Quarry at East Cranmore in Somerset in 1958. 

Since 1949, the stone had been carried to its destination by lorry, but now Foster Yeoman reverted to rail transport. The Merehead Stone Terminal was established in 1970. From there aggregate was removed by high capacity trains. This innovation was followed by the building of the railhead depot and coating plant at Botley, Hampshire, in 1973. On its 75th anniversary, the company published a colorful pictorial history of the company with a focus on its use of railway transport to move the aggregate.

Foster Yeoman bought the derelict Marston House, a Grade II* listed building, near Frome, in 1984. The mansion dates in part from the early 17th century and has 106 rooms. It was restored over a seven-year period as the company headquarters.

John Foster Yeoman died in 1987. He was succeeded by his widow, Angela Yeoman, OBE, DL. Their son, also John Foster Yeoman, became managing director in 1994 and vice chairman in 2004.

Notable landmarks in the company history have included the supplying of aggregate for the Thames Barrier and the M25 motorway. Foster Yeoman also supplied three million tonnes of rock used to make concrete segments for the English side of the Channel Tunnel.

With its substantial interests in Northern Europe, Foster Yeoman now ran a locomotive on German railways from 1997 to 1999. Its other interests include civil engineering and recycling. In 1997, it acquired RJ Maxwell with its London asphalt works and wharves and now operates a very successful contracting division. Continuation of waterborne transport of aggregates on the Thames Tideway was also ensured by the acquisition of Bennetts Barges, which also carried major components of the London Eye and a decommissioned Concorde aircraft. Glensanda granite also provides all replacement track ballast for railways in the South of England.

Foster Yeoman continues to be one of the major suppliers of coated stone products used for projects as diverse as motorways, airports and tennis courts.

In 2006, after protracted family disagreements, Foster Yeoman was wholly acquired by the Holcim Group and is now part of its Aggregate Industries subsidiary.

Quarries

Torr Works (Merehead)

John Yeoman bought the under-exploited Merehead Quarry in 1958. He developed this successfully in association with his chief engineer, Ron Torr, after whom the new quarry was renamed. This second Foster Yeoman quarry became operational in 1964, and was completed with the installation of the Nordberg Primary Crusher in 1970.

In 1985, Torr Works quarry acquired the O & K Mobile Crusher, a five storey high plant which can walk to the current working location, instead of a conventional fixed building which needs to be fed by dumper trucks.

Glensanda
John Yeoman had long been captivated by the idea of the super-quarry to be situated in a remote location from which stone could be exported by sea, which had also been declared as preferred government policy. To this end, and always looking ahead, he bought the Glensanda estate near Oban in Argyll in 1982. A pilot plant was installed (extended in 1996) which extracts granite by the "glory hole" and conveyor belt method, a pioneering development in alternative quarrying technology.

Glensanda went into operation in 1986 when the first shipload of granite left for Houston, Texas, USA. The production director at Glensanda is Kurt Larson, John and Angela Yeoman's son-in-law. Production at the Scottish quarry has now reached six million tonnes a year.

Eighty per cent of Glensanda granite is exported to Europe using Foster Yeoman vessels: the Yeoman Brook, Yeoman Bank, Yeoman Bridge and the Yeoman Bontrup.

Rail operations

Foster Yeoman transports most of its stone product from Merehead to various UK distribution points using the services of jointly-owned rail company Mendip Rail, with Hanson.

In 1993, Foster Yeoman and ARC created a joint venture company, Mendip Rail, combining their locomotives and rolling stock in one streamlined operation. This created the third largest freight company in the UK, moving ten million tonnes of aggregate a year.

Four Class 59 locomotives were commissioned from the USA to pull even heavier and longer loads from Torr Works to stone terminals in southern England. Foster Yeoman was the first national company to run private locomotives on the then British Rail track, and achieved the British records for length and weight of a single train. The Class 59 locomotives and their later derivatives became the standard for freight haulage in the UK.

References

External links
Foster Yeoman Limited website

Companies based in Somerset
Railway companies of the United Kingdom
Mining companies of the United Kingdom
Non-renewable resource companies established in 1923
1923 establishments in England